Kathlapur is a mandal in Jagtial district in the state of Telangana in India.

Panchayats
The following is the list of village panchayats in Kathlapur mandal"
 Bommena
 Bhushanraopet
 Ambaripet
 Chinta Kunta
 Duluru
 Dumpet
 Gambeerpur
 Ippapally
 Kalikota
 Kathlapoor
 Ottapally
 Peggarla
 Posanipet
 Potharam
 Sirkonda
 Thakkalapally
 Thandrial
 Thurthy

References 

Villages in Jagtial district
Mandals in Jagtial district